Jin Mandokoro (born 3 September 1998) is Japanese kickboxer.

Combat Press ranks him as the #4 strawweight in the world, as of August 2021. He was ranked in the flyweight top ten between September 2020, and July 2021.

Kickboxing career
Jin was scheduled to fight Tatsuya Tsubakihara during Hoost Cup Kings Kyoto 2. Tsubakihara won the fight by unanimous decision.

In 2017 he made his RIZIN debut against Issei Ishii. Mandokoro won the fight by majority decision. He re-matched Issei Ishii at KNOCK OUT's Summer FES event. Ishii won the fight by unanimous decision.

In November 2018, at J-FIGHT, he fought Shota Toyama. Mandokoro won the fight by decision.

He was given a chance to fight for the RISE 53 kg title at RISE 132, held at the time by Toki Tamaru. Tamaru won the fight by unanimous decision.

Afterwards, he fought Senga at DEEP☆KICK, and once again dropped a unanimous decision.

He fought Koki Osaki during RISE 135, and won the bout by unanimous decision. He won his second in a row against Kyosuke, winning by a first round KO.

Mandokoro was scheduled to fight Kazuki Osaki during RISE 139. The fight was later cancelled due to the COVID-19 pandemic. The fight was subsequently rescheduled for RISE 140. Osaki won the fight by majority decision.

Mandokoro is scheduled to fight Syuto Sato during Rizin 25. He won the fight by unanimous decision.

During the Kyushu Professional Kickboxing vol.2 event, Mandokoro fought Tatsuya Hibata for the WBKF World Super Flyweight title. He won the fight by a third-round TKO.

Mandokoro was scheduled to fight Soma Tameda at RISE on ABEMA 2. The bout was a qualifier for the RISE Dead or Alive Tournament. Mandokoro won by a first round knockout. After qualifying for the tournament, Mandokoro was scheduled to fight Toki Tamaru in the quarterfinals of the 2021 RISE Dead or Alive 53kg Tournament. He won the fight by unanimous decision. Advancing to the semifinals, Mandokoro was scheduled to face Kazane. Madokoro lost the fight by majority decision.

Mandokoro was scheduled to face Yu Hiramatsu at Rizin Trigger 1 on November 28, 2021. He won the fight by a second-round knockout.

Mandokoro was booked to face Syuto Sato at Rizin 34 – Osaka on March 20, 2022. The fight ended as a no contest after Sato injured his ankle in the first round.

Mandokoro faced the third ranked RISE super flyweight contender Ryu Hanaoka at RISE 161 on August 28, 2022. He lost the fight by a third-round technical knockout, due to doctor stoppage.

Mandokoro faced Koudai Hirayama at RISE 163 on December 10, 2022. He won the fight by unanimous decision, with all three judges scoring the bout 30–29 in his favor.

Championships and accomplishments

Amateur
DEEP KICK
2010 TOP RUN -35kg Champion 
2011 TOP RUN -40kg Champion
2013 TOP RUN -45kg Champion
All Japan Glove Karate Federation
2011 All Japan Glove Karate Federation Middle School Champion
2013 All Japan Glove Karate Federation Middle School Champion

Professional
 2018 J-NETWORK Flyweight Champion
 2021  WBKF World Super Flyweight Champion

Fight record

|-  style="background:#cfc;"
| 2022-12-10|| Win ||align=left| Koudai Hirayama || RISE 163 || Tokyo, Japan || Decision (Unanimous)|| 3 ||3:00 
|-  style="background:#fbb;"
| 2022-08-28|| Loss ||align=left| Ryu Hanaoka || RISE 161 || Tokyo, Japan || TKO (Doctor stoppage) || 3 || 0:21 
|-  style="background:#c5d2ea;"
| 2022-03-20||NC|| align=left| Syuto Sato || Rizin 34 – Osaka || Tokyo, Japan || No contest (ankle injury) || 1 || 
|-  style="background:#cfc;"
| 2021-11-28|| Win ||align=left| Yu Hiramatsu || Rizin Trigger 1 || Kobe, Japan || KO (Right Cross)  || 2 || 1:08
|-  style="text-align:center; background:#fbb;"
| 2021-09-23|| Loss ||align=left| Kazane || RISE WORLD SERIES 2021 Yokohama - Dead or Alive Tournament, Semi Final || Yokohama, Japan || Decision (Majority) || 3 || 3:00
|-  style="text-align:center; background:#cfc;"
| 2021-07-18|| Win ||align=left| Toki Tamaru || RISE WORLD SERIES 2021 Osaka - Dead or Alive Tournament, Quarter Final || Osaka, Japan || Decision (Unanimous) ||3 ||3:00
|-  style="text-align:center; background:#cfc;"
| 2021-05-16 || Win ||align=left| Soma Tameda || RISE on Abema 2|| Tokyo, Japan|| KO (Uppercut + Cross) || 1 || 2:50
|-  style="text-align:center; background:#cfc;"
| 2021-02-14 || Win ||align=left| Tatsuya Hibata || Kyushu Professional Kickboxing vol.2|| Fukuoka, Japan || TKO || 3 || 
|-
! style=background:white colspan=9 |
|-  style="text-align:center; background:#cfc;"
| 2020-11-21 || Win ||align=left| Syuto Sato || Rizin 25 - Osaka || Osaka, Japan|| Decision (Unanimous) || 3 ||3:00
|-  style="text-align:center; background:#fbb;"
| 2020-07-19 || Loss ||align=left| Kazuki Osaki|| RISE 140 || Tokyo, Japan|| Ext.R Decision (Majority) || 4 || 3:00
|-  style="text-align:center; background:#cfc;"
| 2020-02-23 || Win||align=left| Kyosuke ||RISE 137|| Tokyo, Japan||KO (Right Straight) || 1 || 2:39
|-  style="text-align:center; background:#cfc;"
| 2019-11-04 || Win||align=left| Koki Osaki ||RISE 135|| Tokyo, Japan||Decision (Unanimous) || 3 || 3:00
|-  style="text-align:center; background:#FFBBBB;"
| 2019-09-15 || Loss||align=left| Koudai || DEEP KICK 40|| Osaka, Japan || Decision (Unanimous) || 3 || 3:00
|-
! style=background:white colspan=9 |
|-  style="text-align:center; background:#FFBBBB;"
| 2019-05-19|| Loss||align=left| Toki Tamaru || RISE 132 || Tokyo, Japan || Decision (Unanimous)|| 5 || 3:00
|-
! style=background:white colspan=9 |
|-  style="text-align:center; background:#cfc;"
| 2019-03-23 || Win||align=left| Shota Takiya || RISE 131 ||  Tokyo, Japan ||Decision (Unanimous) || 3 || 3:00
|-  style="text-align:center; background:#cfc;"
| 2018-11-18 || Win||align=left| Shota Toyama || J-FIGHT ＆ J-GIRLS 2018 ～4th～ || Tokyo, Japan||Decision (Majority) || 5 || 3:00
|-
! style=background:white colspan=9 |
|-  style="text-align:center; background:#FFBBBB;"
| 2018-08-19 || Loss||align=left| Issei Ishii || KNOCK OUT SUMMER FES.2018 || Tokyo, Japan || Decision (Unanimous) || 5 || 3:00
|-  style="text-align:center; background:#cfc;"
| 2018-05-24 || Win||align=left| Shota Takiya || RISE 124  || Tokyo, Japan|| Decision (Unanimous) || 3 || 3:00
|-  style="text-align:center; background:#cfc;"
| 2018-02-04 || Win||align=left| Kazuya Okuwaki || RISE 122  || Tokyo, Japan|| Decision (Unanimous)|| 3 || 3:00
|-  style="text-align:center; background:#cfc;"
| 2017-10-15 || Win||align=left| Issei Ishii || Rizin World Grand Prix 2017: Opening Round - Part 2 || Fukuoka, Japan || Decision (Majority) || 3 || 3:00
|-  style="text-align:center; background:#FFBBBB;"
| 2017-07-16|| Loss||align=left| Koudai || DEEP KICK 33|| Osaka, Japan || Decision (Split) || 3 || 3:00
|-  style="text-align:center; background:#FFBBBB;"
| 2017-03-05|| Loss ||align=left| Tatsuya Tsubakihara || Hoost Cup Kings Kyoto 2|| Kyoto, Japan || Decision (Unanimous) || 3 || 3:00
|-  style="text-align:center; background:#cfc;"
| 2016-11-03|| Win||align=left| Takasuke || DEEP KICK 31|| Osaka, Japan || TKO (Flying Knee) || 3 || 0:33
|-  style="text-align:center; background:#FFBBBB;"
| 2016-07-17|| Loss ||align=left| Yoshiho Tane || DEEP KICK 30|| Osaka, Japan || Decision (Unanimous) || 3 || 3:00
|-  style="text-align:center; background:#cfc;"
| 2016-03-21|| Win||align=left| Ikki || DEEP KICK 29|| Osaka, Japan || Decision (Split) || 3 || 3:00
|-  style="text-align:center; background:#cfc;"
| 2015-12-23|| Win||align=left| Yuto Kuroda|| DEEP KICK 28|| Osaka, Japan || Decision (Unanimous) || 3 || 3:00
|-
| colspan=9 | Legend:    

|-  style="background:#cfc;"
| 2015-07-16 || Win||align=left| Iori Nishimura || FIghting Championship Mie 2015 || Osaka, Japan || Decision (Unanimous) || 2 || 2:00
|-  style="background:#cfc;"
| 2014-12-23 || Win||align=left| Kaito Nagasawa || NEXT LEVEL Kansai 19|| Osaka, Japan || TKO  || 2 ||
|-  style="background:#FFBBBB;"
| 2014-08-03 || Loss ||align=left| Yoshiho Tane || NEXT LEVEL Kansai 16|| Osaka, Japan || Decision (Majority) || 2 || 2:00
|-  style="background:#FFBBBB;"
| 2013-04-14 || Loss ||align=left| Kouki Higashi || NEXT LEVEL Kansai 6|| Osaka, Japan || Decision (Majority) || 2 || 2:00
|-  style="background:#cfc;"
| 2013-04-14 || Win||align=left| Tasuku Nakajima || NEXT LEVEL Kansai 6|| Osaka, Japan || Decision || 2 || 2:00
|-  style="background:#fbb;"
| 2013-03-31 || Loss ||align=left| Kouki Higashi|| 2013 All Japan Jr. Kick, -45kg Semi Final|| Tokyo, Japan || Decision || 2 || 2:00
|-  style="background:#cfc;"
| 2013-03-31 || Win||align=left| Kizuki Akiyama || 2013 All Japan Jr. Kick, -45kg Quarter Final|| Tokyo, Japan || Decision || 2 || 2:00
|-  style="background:#fbb;"
| 2013-02-10|| Loss ||align=left| Kouki Higashi || Double Impact III, All Japan Jr Kick Kansai Selection || Osaka, Japan || Decision (Uannimous) ||  ||
|-  style="background:#c5d2ea;"
| 2012-10-14 || Draw||align=left| Yoshiki Tane || TOP RUN 4|| Osaka, Japan || Decision || 3 || 2:00
|-
! style=background:white colspan=9 |
|-  style="background:#fbb;"
| 2012-09-23 || Loss ||align=left| Tatsuki Ida || NEXT LEVEL Kansai 1, Final|| Sakai, Japan || Decision (Unanimous)|| 2 || 2:00
|-  style="background:#cfc;"
| 2012-09-23 || Win ||align=left| Hiroto Ichimura || NEXT LEVEL Kansai 1, Semi Final|| Sakai, Japan || Decision (Majority)|| 2 || 2:00
|-  style="background:#FFBBBB;"
| 2012-07-08 || Loss||align=left| Yoshiki Tane || DEEP KICK 12|| Osaka, Japan || Decision (Majority)|| 2 || 2:00
|-  style="background:#c5d2ea;"
| 2012-04-29 || Draw||align=left| Kouki Higashi || DEEP KICK 11|| Osaka, Japan || Decision || 3 || 2:00
|-
! style=background:white colspan=9 |
|-  style="background:#cfc;"
| 2011-10-23 || Win||align=left| Kouki Higashi || DEEP KICK 8|| Osaka, Japan || Decision || 3 || 2:00
|-
! style=background:white colspan=9 |
|-  style="background:#fbb;"
| 2011-04-10 || Loss ||align=left| Takuro Matsunaga || DEEP KICK 6|| Osaka, Japan || Decision (Unanimous)|| 2 || 2:00
|-
! style=background:white colspan=9 |
|-
| colspan=9 | Legend:

See also
 List of male kickboxers

References

1998 births
Living people
Japanese male kickboxers
Flyweight kickboxers
Sportspeople from Osaka